The Chota Char Dham (literally translated as 'the small four abodes/seats', meaning 'the small circuit of four abodes/seats'), is an important Hindu pilgrimage circuit in Uttarakhand, in the Indian Himalayas. Located in the Garhwal region of the state of Uttarakhand, the circuit consists of four sites—Yamunotri, Gangotri, Kedarnath, and Badrinath. Badrinath is also one of the four destinations (with each destination being in different corners of the country) of the longer Char Dham from which the Chota Char Dham likely draws its name.

Akshaya Tritiya (April or May in the Gregorian calendar) marks the beginning of the Chota Char Dham Yatra and closes 2 days after Diwali, on the day of Bhai-Bij (or Bhai Dooj) In May and June, tourists flock in large numbers, due to heavy rainfall greater chances of roadblocks/landslides in late July and August (Monsoon season).

The Annual Chota Char Dham Yatra resumed in May 2014, after remaining suspended since the outbreak of 2013 Uttarakhand floods. The footfall has now improved due to proactive measures taken by the government of Uttarakhand. In 2022, in just 2 months (10 June – 10 August), 2.8 million pilgrims have visited these Dhams.

A record 4.1 million pilgrims visited Chota Char dham in 2022. Over 1.4 million pilgrims have already visited Kedarnath, over 600,000 have visited Gangotri, and over 500,000 have visited Yamunotri. Around 1.5 million pilgrims have already visited Badrinath the same year.

Origins and the original Char Dham 

Originally, the appellation Char Dham referred to a pilgrimage circuit encompassing four important temples—Puri, Rameswaram, Dwarka, and Badrinath—located roughly at the four cardinal points of the subcontinent. An archetypal All-India pilgrimage circuit, the formation of the original Char Dham is credited to the great 8th century reformer and philosopher Shankaracharya (Adi Sankara). In the original Char Dham, three of the four sites are Vaishnava (Puri, Dwarka and Badrinath) while one is Shaiva (Rameswaram). The Chota Char Dham included representatives from all three major Hindu sectarian traditions, with two Shakti (goddess) sites, (Yamunotri and Gangotri), one Shaiva site (Kedarnath), and one Vaishnava site (Badrinath).

Accessible until the 1950s only by arduous and lengthy walking trails in hilly area with height repeatedly exceeded 4000 meters, the Chota Char Dham was regularly done by wandering ascetics and other religious people, and those who could afford a traveling entourage. While the individual sites and the circuit as a whole were well known to Hindus on the plains below, they were not a particularly visible aspect of yearly religious culture. After the 1962 war between India and China, accessibility to the Chota Char Dham improved, as India undertook massive road building to border area and other infrastructure investments. As pilgrims were able to travel in mini buses, jeeps and cars to nearest points of four shrines, the Chota Char dham circuit was within the reach of people with middle income. Vehicles reach up to Badrinath temple and Gangotri, Yamunotri and Kedarnath are at a distance of 10 to 15 km from nearest motorable road.

Recent development 
The Chota Char Dham has become an important destination for pilgrims from throughout South Asia and the diaspora. Today, the circuit receives hundreds of thousands of visitors in an average pilgrimage season, which lasts from approximately 15 April until Diwali (sometime in November). The season is heaviest in the two-month period before the monsoon, which normally comes in late July. After the rains begin, travel to the sites becomes extremely dangerous. Even before the rains begin, safety is a major concern, as extensive road building and heavy traffic have critically destabilized the rocks, making fatal landslides and bus/jeep accidents a regular occurrence. Mortality rates for a season often surpass 200. Some pilgrims also visit the sites after the rains ends and before the sites become impassable due to snow. Although temperatures at the shrines in the early winter months of October and November are inhospitable, it is said that the mountain scenery surrounding the sites is most vivid after the rains have had a chance to moisten the dust of the plains below. The Chota Char Dham was washed away in the recent 2013 North India floods. One of the worst flash floods happened in June 2013 and it heavily devastated many parts of the Chota Char Dham, particularly the town of Kedarnath was almost destroyed and with only the Kedarnath Temple and a few buildings around remaining intact, albeit partially submerged by rocks and slurry.

Chota Char Dham Railway project's 321 km long construction, costing INR432.92 billion (US$6.6 billion), commenced with Final Location Survey (FSL) by the government of India in May 2017.

Pilgrimage

Access to the pilgrimage is either from Haridwar, or Rishikesh, or from Dehradun. The tradition is to visit the sites in the following order:
Yamunotri, the source of the Yamuna River and the head of the goddess Yamuna.
Gangotri, the source of the Ganges (River Ganga) and head of the goddess Ganga.
Kedarnath, where a form of the Hindu god Shiva is venerated as one of the 12 Jyotirlingas, This is also the foremost of the Panch Kedar Temples in Uttarakhand.
Badrinath, the seat of the Hindu god Vishnu in his aspect of Badrinarayan, one of the 108 Divya Desams.

Uttarakhand Char Dham Opening Dates 2023 
Every year, as summer begins in April or May, the sacred shrines of Chardham open and close with the onset of the winter months in October or November. From April through May through October through November, pilgrims can visit Kedarnath, Badrinath, Gangotri, and Yamunotri at the Char Dham shrines. All of the shrines are closed throughout the winter and can be visited during this time for devotion.

Char Dham Opening & Closing Dates 2023

References

Chota Char Dham temples
Hindu temples in Uttarakhand
Religious tourism in India
Hindu pilgrimage sites
Hindu pilgrimage sites in India
Hindu pilgrimages
Uttarakhand